A rivalry is the opposition between two competing parties (rivals). Someone's main rival is an archrival.

Rivalry, rival, The Rivals, or arch rival may also refer to:

Film 
Rivals (1923 film), a silent German film by Harry Piel
Rivals (1925 film), a film starring Oliver Hardy
 The Rivals (1926 film), a Swedish silent comedy film directed by Gustaf Edgren
The Rival (film), a 1956 Italian-French melodrama 
Rivals (1972 film), an American film
Rivals (2008 film), a French film
Rivalry (film), a 1953 Italian film
The Stalking of Laurie Show or Rivals, a 2000 TV film
The Rivals, a 1938 TV film starring Eric Portman

Gaming 
 Rivalry (video game), a 2015 sword fighting video game
Arch Rivals, a 1989 basketball arcade video game
Command & Conquer: Rivals, a mobile phone game
Need for Speed Rivals, a 2013 racing video game
Sonic Rivals, a 2006 video game

Literature and theatre
 The Rivals (1664 play), a play by William Davenant 
 The Rivals, a 1775 play by Richard Brinsley Sheridan
 Rivals (novel), a 1988 novel by Jilly Cooper
 The Rival, a 1997 novel by Kristine Kathryn Rusch
 The Rival, a Reverse-Flash comic book villain

Music 
The Rivals (band), an English punk band
The Rivals, a one-off group formed for the song "2nd Best to None" by Benny Andersson and Björn Ulvaeus

Albums
Rivals (album), a 2015 album by Coal Chamber
The Rivalry (album), a 1998 album by Running Wild
Rivals, a 2013 classical album by David Hansen
A Rival, a 1997 album by Alannah Myles

Songs
"Rival" (song), a 2011 song by Romeo Santos
"Rivals" (song), a 2016 song by Usher
"Rival", a 2000 song by Pearl Jam from Binaural
"Rival", a Pokémon Pocket Monsters theme song

Places 
The Rivals (mountain), a mountain in Wales
Rivals, Kentucky, U.S.

Ships
Rival (sternwheeler), a steamboat
USS Rival, the name of two U.S. Navy ships

Television and radio
The Rivals (TV play) (1961)
The Challenge: Rivals, season 21 of the MTV reality game show
Popstars: The Rivals, a British talent show
"Rivals" (Star Trek: Deep Space Nine), an episode of Star Trek: Deep Space Nine
"Rivalry", an episode of Code Lyoko: Evolution
"Rivals", an episode of Frasier
"The Rivals", an episode of The O.C.
"Rivalries", an episode of Undergrads
The Rivals, a 2011 BBC radio drama series with lead character Inspector Lestrade

Other uses
The Rivals, the English name of Welsh mountain Yr Eifl
Rivalry (economics), a characteristic of consumption of goods
Rivals.com, a sports recruiting website
Aeros Rival, a Ukrainian competition paraglider
The Rival Company, an American appliance maker

See also
Binocular rivalry
College rivalry
List of sports rivalries
Monocular rivalry
The Rivalry (disambiguation)
Sibling rivalry

:Category:Business rivalries
:Category:Fictional rivalries
:Category:Geopolitical rivalry
:Category:Ideological rivalry
:Category:Musical rivalries
:Category:Regional rivalries
:Category:Sports rivalries